Abhijit Deshmukh can refer to:

 Abhijit Deshmukh (engineer), an Indian engineer
 Abhijit Deshmukh (umpire), an Indian cricket umpire